Two-man bobsleigh at the 1964 Winter Olympics took place on 31 January and 1 February at Bob und Rodelbahn Igls, Innsbruck, Austria. This event was last run at the 1956 Winter Olympics as bobsleigh was not part of the 1960 games.

The winning athletes were those who posted the shortest total time over four separate runs. British duo Anthony NashRobin Thomas Dixon took gold, the first medal of any kind on this event for Great Britain. Taking silver and bronze were the two Italian crews.

Results

References

Bobsleigh at the 1964 Winter Olympics